Constantin Marin (27 February 1925 – 1 January 2011) was a Romanian award-winning musician, conductor and composer.

Biography

Marin was born in Urleta, Prahova County, Romania. He was the founder in 1963 of the Madrigal Chamber Choir and had been its conductor and director ever since. He was well-known all over the world for his expertise on Renaissance music, Baroque, Gregorian songs and Traditional Romanian music. He was designated a UNESCO Goodwill Ambassador in 1992.

References

1925 births
2011 deaths
People from Prahova County
Romanian musicians
Romanian conductors (music)
Male conductors (music)
UNESCO Goodwill Ambassadors